Yusuke Nakamura may refer to:

, Japanese footballer
, Japanese geneticist and cancer researcher